The Abolition of Bridge Tolls (Scotland) Act is an Act of the Scottish Parliament passed in 2008 is a piece of legislation to abolish tolls on all road bridges in Scotland. In practice, it removed the remaining tolls on the Forth Road Bridge and the Tay Road Bridge and repealed legislation relating to the Erskine Bridge.

Background
Tolls on the Skye Bridge had been controversial since its opening, and these were abolished in 2004.

The Bill was a fulfilment of the commitment in the SNP manifesto for the May 2007 election to remove the tolls on the Forth and Tay Road Bridges. Leaving the two road bridges into and out of Fife as the only remaining toll bridges in Scotland was described as "unacceptable and unfair". The provisions of the Bill removed this anomaly, making the entire road network in Scotland "consistent and fair".

Passage through Parliament
The Bill was introduced as an Executive Bill by John Swinney MSP on 3 September 2007. The Abolition of Bridge Tolls (Scotland) Act 2008 asp 1 was passed by the Scottish Parliament on 7 December 2007. The act was given the Royal Assent on 24 January 2008.

See also
List of Acts of the Scottish Parliament from 1999
Erskine Bridge Tolls Act 2001

References

External links 

Policy Memorandum, Scottish Parliament, 3 September 2007

Acts of the Scottish Parliament 2008
 
Toll (fee)